Through My Thick Glasses is an animated short film, directed by Pjotr Sapegin and released in 2004. A Canadian-Norwegian coproduction, the film features the voices of Odd Børretzen and Sossen Krohg as the grandparents of a young girl who is listening to her grandfather tell a story about his experiences during World War II.

The film premiered at the 2004 Annecy International Animation Film Festival.

Awards
The film received an honorable mention for the Jury Prize at Annecy.

The film was a Genie Award nominee for Best Animated Short at the 25th Genie Awards in 2005, and won the award for Best Canadian Short Film at the 2005 CFC Worldwide Short Film Festival. 

It was the winner of the Grand Prize at the 2005 Tampere Film Festival, and the Audience Award at the 2005 Animated Encounters festival.

References

External links

2004 animated films
2004 films
2000s animated short films
National Film Board of Canada animated short films
2004 short films
Canadian animated short films
Norwegian animated short films
2000s Canadian films